Lachlan Swinton (born 16 January 1997) is an Australian rugby union player who plays for the  in the Super Rugby competition.  His position of choice is flanker.

References

External links
 

Australian rugby union players
Australia international rugby union players
Rugby union locks
Rugby union flankers
New South Wales Waratahs players
New South Wales Country Eagles players
Sydney (NRC team) players
1997 births
Living people
Rugby union number eights
Rugby union players from Sydney